John Burns Hynd (4 April 1902 – 8 November 1971) was a British Labour Party politician.

Educated at St Ninian's Episcopal School and Caledonian Road School, Perth, he left school at 14 and became a Railway Clerk in the District Office of the London, Midland and Scottish Railway, Perth, where he worked until 1925. He then became a Trade Union Clerk with the National Union of Railwaymen until 1944.

Hynd was elected as Member of Parliament (MP) for Sheffield Attercliffe at a by-election in 1944, holding the seat until 1970.
He held office as Chancellor of the Duchy of Lancaster, and Minister for Germany and Austria, 1945–1947, and as Minister of Pensions during 1947.

He was a Member of the General Medical Council from 1950 to 1955. He was Chairman of the Anglo-German and Anglo-Latin American Parliamentary Groups. 
He was awarded the Grand Cross of Merit with Star (West German Republic) in 1958, the Chevalier of the Legion of Honour, and Great Golden Cross of Honour with Star (Austria). He died in Enfield aged 69.

References

External links 
 
 
The Papers of John Burns Hynd held at the Churchill Archives Centre

1902 births
1971 deaths
Knights Commander of the Order of Merit of the Federal Republic of Germany
Labour Party (UK) MPs for English constituencies
National Union of Railwaymen-sponsored MPs
British Secretaries of State
People from Perth, Scotland
UK MPs 1935–1945
UK MPs 1945–1950
UK MPs 1950–1951
UK MPs 1951–1955
UK MPs 1955–1959
UK MPs 1959–1964
UK MPs 1964–1966
UK MPs 1966–1970
Ministers in the Attlee governments, 1945–1951
Chancellors of the Duchy of Lancaster